Nico Sijmens (born 1 April 1978 in Diest, Belgium) is a retired Belgian road racing cyclist, who competed professionally between 2001 and 2014.

Career achievements

Major results

2002
 4th Overall Vuelta a La Rioja
 5th Le Samyn
2003
 Tour of Austria
1st Stages 4 & 6
 9th Clásica de Almería
 10th Classic Loire Atlantique
2004
 1st Grand Prix Pino Cerami
 3rd Brabantse Pijl
 3rd Grand Prix de Denain
 8th Rund um Köln
 9th Grand Prix de Wallonie
2005
 1st Overall Regio-Tour
1st Stage 2
 1st Hel van het Mergelland
 2nd Brussel–Ingooigem
 6th Grote Prijs Jef Scherens
 9th Overall Tour de Wallonie
2006
 2nd Overall Tour de Wallonie
1st Stage 3
 6th Tour du Doubs
 8th Overall Driedaagse van West-Vlaanderen
 8th Grote Prijs Jef Scherens
 10th Hel van het Mergelland
 10th Le Samyn
2007
 1st Beverbeek Classic
 1st Hel van het Mergelland
 7th Tour de la Somme
 9th Grand Prix de Wallonie
2008
 2nd Boucles de l'Aulne
 4th Le Samyn
 8th Tour du Haut Var
 9th Hel van het Mergelland
 9th Grand Prix de Plumelec-Morbihan
 10th Brabantse Pijl
2009
 7th Paris–Brussels
2010
1st Stage 15 Vuelta a España
2011
 9th Halle–Ingooigem
2012
 2nd Overall Boucles de la Mayenne
1st Stage 2
 8th Overall Tour de Picardie
2013
 1st  Overall Rhône-Alpes Isère Tour
1st  Points classification
1st Stage 3
 10th Overall Tour de Luxembourg
2014
 7th Boucles de l'Aulne

Grand Tour general classification results timeline

References

External links
  

Belgian male cyclists
Living people
1978 births
People from Diest
Cyclists from Flemish Brabant